The Little Vieux Fort River is a river in Vieux Fort Quarter of the island country of Saint Lucia.  It is a tributary of the Vieux Fort River.

See also
List of rivers of Saint Lucia

References

Rivers of Saint Lucia